Józef Matlak was a Polish luger who competed during the 1960s. He won the bronze medal in the men's singles event at the 1967 FIL European Luge Championships in Königssee, West Germany.

References
List of European luge champions 
Poland at the 1968 Winter Olympics featuring Matlak 

Polish male lugers
Year of birth missing (living people)
Living people
Place of birth missing (living people)